Vernon Anthony Walters (January 3, 1917 – February 10, 2002) was a United States Army officer and a diplomat. Most notably, he served from 1972 to 1976 as Deputy Director of Central Intelligence, from 1985 to 1989 as the United States Ambassador to the United Nations and from 1989 to 1991 as Ambassador to the Federal Republic of Germany during the decisive phase of German Reunification. Walters rose to the rank of lieutenant general in the U.S. Army and is a member of the Military Intelligence Hall of Fame.

Background
Walters was born in New York City, his father being a British immigrant and insurance salesman. From age 6 he lived in Britain and France with his family. His formal education beyond elementary school consisted only of boarding school instruction at Stonyhurst College, a Jesuit school in Lancashire, England, and he did not attend university. At the age of sixteen he left school and returned to the United States to work for his father as an insurance claims adjuster and investigator. 

In later years he seemed to enjoy reflecting on the fact that he had risen high and accomplished much despite an almost total lack of formal education.

He was fluent in French, Italian, Spanish, and Portuguese as well as his native English. He also spoke German fluently, but, as he joked, inaccurately, and knew the basics of several other languages. His simultaneous translation of a speech by United States President Richard Nixon in France prompted French President Charles de Gaulle to say to Nixon, "You gave a magnificent speech, but your interpreter was eloquent."

Military career

1940s and 50s

Walters joined the Army in 1941 and was one of the over 12,000 Ritchie Boys serving at Camp Ritchie. Soon after he was commissioned. He served in Africa and Italy during World War II. He served as a link between the commands of Brazilian Expeditionary Force and U.S. Fifth Army, earning medals for distinguished military and intelligence achievements.

He served as an aide and interpreter for several Presidents. He was at President Harry S. Truman's side as an interpreter in key meetings with America's Spanish- and Portuguese-speaking Latin American allies. His language skills helped him win Truman's confidence, and he accompanied the President to the Pacific in the early 1950s, serving as a key aide in Truman's unsuccessful effort to reach a reconciliation with an insubordinate General Douglas MacArthur, the Commander of United Nations forces in Korea.

In Europe in the 1950s, Walters served President Dwight Eisenhower and other top US officials as a translator and aide at a series of NATO summit conferences. During this period he participated in the famous visit of Eisenhower to General Franco. He also worked in Paris at Marshall Plan headquarters and helped set up the Supreme Headquarters Allied Powers in Europe. He was with then-Vice President Richard Nixon in 1958 when an anti-American crowd stoned their car in Caracas, Venezuela.  Walters suffered facial cuts from flying glass. The Vice President escaped injury.

1960s
In the 1960s, Walters served as a U.S. military attaché in France, Italy, and Brazil. In 1961, he proposed an American military intervention in Italy if the Socialist Party had participated in the Government.

While serving as a military attaché in Paris from 1967 to 1972, Walters played a role in secret peace talks with North Vietnam. He arranged to smuggle National Security Advisor Henry Kissinger into France for secret meetings with a senior North Vietnamese official, and then smuggle him out again. He accomplished this by borrowing a private airplane from an old friend, French President Georges Pompidou. He had previously been chosen by Richard Nixon to be their translator/interpreter during Pompidou's 1970 trip to the United States.

1970s

President Richard Nixon appointed Walters as Deputy Director for Central Intelligence (DDCI) in 1972. (Following the abbreviated incumbency of James R. Schlesinger, Walters also served as Acting DCI for two months in the summer of 1973.) During his four years as DDCI he worked closely with four successive Directors as the Agency and the nation confronted such major international developments as the 1973 Arab-Israeli war, the subsequent oil crisis, the turbulent end of the Vietnam War, the Chilean military coup against the Allende government and the Letelier assassination. According to a close colleague, Walters also averted "a looming catastrophe" for the CIA in connection with the Watergate scandal:

Despite numerous importunings from on high, [Walters] flatly refused to ... cast a cloak of national security over the guilty parties. At the critical moment he ... refused to involve the Agency and bluntly informed the highest levels of the executive [branch] that further insistence from that quarter would result in his immediate resignation.

Walters himself reflected on those challenging days in his 1978 autobiography Silent Missions:

I told [President Nixon's White House counsel] that on the day I went to work at the CIA I had hung on the wall of my office a color photograph showing the view through the window of my home in Florida. When people asked me what it was, I told them [this] was what was waiting [for me] if anyone squeezed me too hard.

Diplomatic career

Beginning in 1981 Walters served under Ronald Reagan as roving ambassador.
Reagan used prominent Catholics in his government such as Walters to brief the pope during the Cold War.
Walters was then United States Ambassador to the United Nations from 1985 to 1989 and ambassador to the Federal Republic of Germany from 1989 to 1991, being responsible on behalf of the United States for the preparations of the Treaty on the Final Settlement with Respect to Germany. In 1986, he received the Golden Plate Award of the American Academy of Achievement. In 1987 he visited Fiji, two weeks after Timoci Bavadra came to office. Bavadra wanted to create a nuclear-free zone in Fiji. William Bodde Jr. had said previously about this: "a nuclear free zone would be unacceptable to the US given our strategic needs (...) the US must do everything possible to counter this movement". Walters spoke with Bavadra and Sitiveni Rabuka. Two weeks later Bavadra was overthrown by Rabuka.

Retirement and death
During the 1990s, after he had retired from public life, Walters worked as a business consultant and was active on the lecture circuit.  On November 18, 1991, he was presented with the Presidential Medal of Freedom by President George H. W. Bush. He wrote another book, The Mighty and the Meek (published in 2001), which profiled famous people with whom he had worked during his life.

Upon his death in 2002 he was buried in Arlington National Cemetery.

In popular culture
Walters was portrayed by Garrick Hagon in the 2002 BBC production of Ian Curteis's controversial The Falklands Play.

See also
 1964 Brazilian coup d'état

References

 A tribute by Henry R. Appelbaum (This work is in the public domain)
 Book: Silent Missions. Autobiography, Publisher, Doubleday 1978; 
 George Bush Presidential Library and Museum

Further reading
 de Oliveira, Frank Márcio. Attaché Extraordinaire: Vernon A. Walters and Brazil. Washington, D.C.: National Defense Intelligence College (Mar. 2006)

External links

 Finding aid for the Vernon A. Walters Oral History, Dwight D. Eisenhower Presidential Library
 Alan Goodman discuses the role of the United States at the UN and the UN's contributions to American foreign policy with Vernon Walters on American Interests (1987)
 New York Times obituary
 Interview on Central American Crisis of 1984 from the Dean Peter Krogh Foreign Affairs Digital Archives
 Full testimony (video) before the Senate Watergate Committee
 

|-

|-

|-

|-

|-

1917 births
2002 deaths
20th-century American politicians
20th-century translators
Ambassadors of the United States to Germany
American people of British descent
Burials at Arlington National Cemetery
Commanders Crosses of the Order of Merit of the Federal Republic of Germany
Deputy Directors of the Central Intelligence Agency
Interpreters
People educated at Stonyhurst College
People of the Defense Intelligence Agency
Member of the Academy of the Kingdom of Morocco
Permanent Representatives of the United States to the United Nations
Presidential Medal of Freedom recipients
Reagan administration cabinet members
United States Army generals
United States military attachés
American Roman Catholics
Ritchie Boys
20th-century American diplomats
American expatriates in the United Kingdom
American expatriates in France